The 2020 PSL season was the eighth season of the Philippine Super Liga (PSL) which began on February 29, 2020 with the 2020 Grand Prix Conference. 

The COVID-19 pandemic forced the end of the season with the Grand Prix being the only conference held. The Grand Prix Conference prematurely ended on March 23, 2020 after the PSL indefinitely postponed games. Prior to the suspension, its last played game day March 10, 2020 was held behind closed doors. 

The PSL attempted to resume play through the Beach Volleyball Challenge Cup, an invitational beach volleyball tournament open to non-PSL teams in November in Subic. However the plan was cancelled due to inclement weather conditions anticipated until the end of the year. The PSL plans to hold the beach tournament sometime in February 2021.

Teams

Preliminary round

Team standings 

|}

All times are in Philippines Standard Time (UTC+08:00)

First round 

|}

Venues
 Bacoor Strike Gym
 Filoil Flying V Centre

Brand ambassador
 Mary Joy Baron (2020)

Broadcast partners
 One Sports

References

Philippine Super Liga
PSL
PSL
PSL season